Atopostipes suicloacalis  is a rod-shaped and non-spore-forming bacterium from the genus of Atopostipes which has been isolated from a swine manure storage pit in the United States.

References

External links
Type strain of Atopostipes suicloacalis at BacDive -  the Bacterial Diversity Metadatabase	

Lactobacillales
Bacteria described in 2004